Himmatwala is a 2013 Indian Hindi-language action comedy film written and directed by Sajid Khan and jointly produced by UTV Motion Pictures and Vashu Bhagnani. The film features Ajay Devgn and Tamannaah in the lead roles. Set in 1983, it is an official remake of the 1983 film of the same name by K. Raghavendra Rao, which was, in turn, a remake of the 1981 Telugu film Ooruki Monagadu. The film was released on 29 March 2013. The film marks Tamannaah's comeback to Bollywood after she debuted in the 2005 film Chand Sa Roshan Chehra.

Plot
Set in 1983, the story begins with Ravi (Ajay Devgn) winning a fighting competition at a club. He is known as Himmatwala (courageous man). He then goes to Ramnagar village, where he meets his mother, Savitri (Zarina Wahab), and his younger sister, Padma (Leena Jumani), who are living miserable life.

Ravi's mother Savitri, tells Ravi that Ravi's father Dharamurthy (Anil Dhawan) was an honest and respected man, and he was the priest of the temple. His father was framed by Sher Singh (Mahesh Manjrekar), the tyrant zamindar (landlord), for robbing the temple since the latter saw him commit a murder. Disgusted, Ravi's father committed suicide. In revenge, young Ravi tried to kill Sher Singh but failed. When Ravi's house is burnt, Savitri tells him to run away as Sher Singh will kill him.

With revenge in his mind, Ravi beats up Narayan Das (Paresh Rawal), Sher Singh's manager and brother-in-law, as well as threatens Sher Singh. The next day, he publicly humiliates Sher Singh's daughter, Rekha (Tamannaah), because she was beating up her innocent driver. In response, Rekha unleashes a tiger in the village in front of Ravi. Her plan was unsuccessful, however, as it backfired. Rekha falls down from the terrace and is about to be attacked by the animal when Ravi jumps and saves her life. Rekha falls in love with Ravi, and afterward, saves Ravi's life against her father Sher Singh's plans.

On the other hand, Ravi learns that Padma is in love with Shakti (Adhyayan Suman), Narayan Das's son. He has his objections, and so has Narayan. However, Sher Singh tells Narayan Das that marrying Shakti with Padma would give them an upper hand over Ravi as they can ill-treat Padma and keep Ravi in control. Meanwhile, Padma now knows that Ravi, who is living with her, is not the real Ravi (Riteish Deshmukh), and Ravi died in a road accident. Before dying, the real Ravi asked him to take care of his family. Padma is initially upset but then reconciles after Ravi saves her life.

Shortly after Padma and Shakti get married, both the father and son start ill-treating Padma. In revenge, Ravi uses Rekha against her own father, just like she advises him. After Rekha tells her father, Sher Singh, that she is pregnant with Ravi's child, Sher Singh begs Ravi to marry Rekha. Eventually, Ravi punished Narayan Das and Shakti by doing all the household chores. He also wins the Sarpanch election, and Sher Singh finally gives all the property documents back to the villagers, which Sher Singh had illegally taken from them before.

However, Shakti overhears Rekha and Ravi's conversation about the fake pregnancy and that he is not the real Ravi. Angered, Sher Singh tries to kill him by bringing 20 fighters from the city but failed. While they are beating Ravi, the tiger (which Ravi had fought with) comes and saves his life. Ravi then brutally beats Shakti and is about to kill Sher Singh when his mother stops him.

In the end, Sher Singh, Narayan Das, and Shakti ask for forgiveness from Ravi, Savitri, Padma, and the rest of the villagers.

Cast

 Ajay Devgn as Ravi Verma (II) "Himmatwala" Ravi, Rekha's love interest and Ravi's friend
 Tamannaah as Rekha Singh, Ravi (II)'s love interest and Sher Singh's daughter (Mona Ghosh Shetty as the Hindi dubbing voice)
 Paresh Rawal as Narayan Das, Sher Singh's brother-in-law, Shakti's father, and Rekha's uncle
 Mahesh Manjrekar as Sher Singh, Rekha's father
 Adhyayan Suman as Shakti Das, Narayan's son, Rekha's cousin, Padma's husband, and Ravi's brother-in-law
 Zarina Wahab as Savitri Verma , Dharamurthy's widow, Ravi and Padma's mother, and Shakti's mother-in-law
 Leena Jumani as Padma Verma/Padma Shakti Das, Savitri and Dharamurthy's daughter, Ravi's younger sister, and Shakti's wife
 Anil Dhawan as Dharamurthy Verma , Savitri's dead husband, Ravi and Padma's father, and Shakti's father-in-law

Special appearances
 Riteish Deshmukh as Ravi Verma , Savitri and Dharamurthy's dead son, Padma's older brother, and Ravi (II)'s friend
 Chunky Pandey as Michael Jaikishan
 Surveen Chawla in song "Dhoka Dhoka"
 Amruta Khanvilkar in song "Dhoka Dhoka"
 Sayantani Ghosh in song "Dhoka Dhoka"
 Rinku Ghosh in song "Dhoka Dhoka"
 Mona Thiba in song "Dhoka Dhoka"
 Sonakshi Sinha in the song "Thank God It's Friday"

Promotion
The first look poster of Himmatwala film was released on 23 March 2013, whilst the trailer was released on 24 January 2013.

Soundtrack

The soundtrack includes remakes of the songs from the original version of the film, "Taki O Taki" and "Nainon Mein Sapna". The song promo of "Naino Mein Sapna" was released on 8 February 2013. The background score was composed by Sandeep Shirodkar, while the songs are composed by Sajid–Wajid and Sachin–Jigar. Lyricist Indeevar wrote for "Taki O Taki" and "Nainon Mein Sapna", alongside Sameer, who wrote for all the songs except a disco-based song, for which lyricist Mayur Puri wrote.

Track listing

References

External links
 

2010s Hindi-language films
2013 films
Films scored by Bappi Lahiri
Films scored by Sajid–Wajid
Remakes of Indian films
Hindi remakes of Telugu films
UTV Motion Pictures films
Indian action comedy films
2013 action comedy films
Indian historical action films
2013 masala films
Films directed by Sajid Khan (director)
2013 comedy films